The MS Explorer or MV Explorer was a Liberian-registered cruise ship, the first vessel of that kind used specifically to sail the icy waters of the Antarctic Ocean. She was the first cruise ship to sink there, after striking an iceberg on 23 November 2007. All passengers and crew were rescued. 

The ship was commissioned and operated by the Swedish explorer Lars-Eric Lindblad. Its 1969 expeditionary cruise to Antarctica was the forerunner for today's sea-based tourism in that region. The vessel was originally named MS Lindblad Explorer (until 1985), and MS Society Explorer (until 1992). Ownership of the vessel changed several times, the last owner being the Toronto-based travel company G.A.P Adventures which acquired Explorer in 2004.

Explorer was abandoned in the early hours of 23 November 2007 after taking on water near the South Shetland Islands in the Southern Ocean, an area which is usually stormy but was calm at the time. This is broadly consistent with the direction of the prevailing current.

History

Explorer was commissioned by Lars-Eric Lindblad, the Swedish-American pioneer of "exotic expedition" tours, and built in 1969 at Uudenkaupungin Telakka, a shipyard in Uusikaupunki, Finland. The ship was built to stay afloat with two compartments filled with water. Her original Finnish-Swedish ice class was 1C, which is relatively weak. It is not known when the ice class was uprated to 1A. The vessel was originally named Lindblad Explorer, after Lars-Eric Lindblad, and was the first custom-built expeditionary cruise ship.

The first notable incident of the Explorer was when it ran aground near La Plaza Point, Antarctica, on 11 February 1972; her passengers, Lindblad among them, were rescued by the Chilean Navy. She was towed to Buenos Aires, Argentina, and then to Kristiansand, Norway, for repairs. After being renamed the Lindblad Explorer, the ship ran aground off Wiencke Island in the Antarctic on 25 December 1979. The 70 passengers and 34 of the crew were rescued by the Chilean Navy Antarctic transport Piloto Pardo, leaving the captain and a skeleton crew of 21 on board to await the arrival of a tugboat.

Explorer was the first cruise ship to navigate the Northwest Passage in 1984. She was involved in the rescue of the crew of an Argentine supply ship in 1989 that had hit a rock ledge off Anvers Island, Antarctica.

Explorer was depicted on at least two postage stamps issued by South Georgia, and one issued by the Falkland Islands. Explorer was nicknamed "the Little Red Ship". A scale model of Explorer is on display at Canterbury Museum, Christchurch, New Zealand.

Sinking

Explorer departed from Ushuaia, Argentina, on 11 November 2007 on a 19-day cruise called Spirit of Shackleton run by GAP, intended to trace the route of 20th century explorer Ernest Shackleton through the Drake Passage (an area typically stormy with rough seas). After visiting the Falkland Islands and South Georgia, she hit an iceberg on 23 November 2007 in the Bransfield Strait, close to King George Island in the Southern Ocean and near the South Shetland Islands. The iceberg struck by Explorer made a gash in the hull which allowed water to enter. The Argentine navy later said in a statement that it had observed "significant" damage. The official report of the sinking noted: "The damage sustained had to have extended along the length of the vessel from Cabins 308 to 314 for at least a distance of 3.6 meters, and, in all likelihood, had punctured and sliced holes along the shell plating."

Some passengers on Explorer reported a loud "bang" at the time of impact, although others reported that there had been no noticeable impact, or at least nothing more than the normal crunching of ice experienced when sailing through icy waters. One passenger reported sea water in their cabin at about 03:00 UTC. Some reports also indicated that the ship had drifted into an iceberg on Explorer starboard side while the crew was assessing damage caused by the original impact, also to the starboard side of the ship.

A Mayday call was put out by the ship at 04:24 UTC, and rescue operations were quickly coordinated by the DPA Peter Burman in Sweden who directly took contact with the Prefectura Naval Argentina (the Argentinian equivalent of a coastguard) and the Chilean Navy Center for Search and Rescue. Chile dispatched the icebreaker Almirante Óscar Viel, and nearby commercial ships; including the MN Ushuaia, the National Geographic Endeavor, and the Norwegian Coastal Express ship  which was operating as a passenger cruise ship at the time. By 07:30 UTC all 91 passengers, 9 guides and 54 crew, from over 14 countries, had taken to the Explorer lifeboats. They drifted for 5 hours until they were picked up by the Norwegian ship MS Nordnorge, which arrived on scene at approximately 10:00 UTC.

All of those rescued by Nordnorge were taken to the Chilean Frei Montalva Station on King George Island, from where they were subsequently airlifted by C-130 Hercules transport aircraft of the Chilean Air Force to Punta Arenas, Chile, in two separate flights; one on Saturday 24 November and the other on Sunday 25 November. Those passengers not taken to Punta Arenas (an estimated 70) were taken to Uruguay's Artigas Base. Explorer was completely submerged at 19:00 UTC, approximately 20 hours after the initial impact and damage to her hull.

Explorer was designed, like most ships, with compartments which could be sealed off by watertight doors. The ship would not sink if holed and one compartment flooded, but was not safe if more compartments were flooded, either by a gash spanning compartments or imperfect sealing between compartments. GAP reported that there was a crack in addition to the hole, but it is not clear if it spanned compartments.

In an article published on 8 December 2007, experts considered that Explorer was "perfect for ice navigation", and stated that the explanation of the sinking "doesn't add up" and that "essential pieces of the story are missing".

Investigation

The investigation into the sinking of Explorer was carried out by the Liberian Bureau of Maritime Affairs. The report into the accident was released in April 2009. The report cites the decision by Captain Bengt Wiman, age 49, to enter the ice field based on his knowledge and information available at the time as the primary reason why Explorer was so severely damaged. "He was under the mistaken impression that he was encountering first year ice, which in fact, as the Chilean Navy Report indicated, was much harder land ice."

Passengers reported seeing red paint on the passing ice less than thirty minutes prior to when the flooding was reported, another indication that the vessel was passing through compact and hard ice. The master of Explorer was very experienced in Baltic waters, but he was unfamiliar with the type of ice he encountered in Antarctic waters. The report's investigating officer could not convince GAP that it was their responsibility to retrieve the ship's Voyage Data Recorder, after the master failed to ensure its transfer from the ship despite being reminded to do so. The report also found that, given that the GAP staff "served the function of crew members", they should have had "the required safety training and documents as seafarers".

The report praises the performance of the master and crew in organizing and evacuating the passengers, and notes that lives were likely saved due to the actions of these individuals.

References

Notes

External links

 Bureau of Maritime Affairs report on the sinking.
 A first-hand passenger account of the sinking with photos.

1969 ships
2007 in Antarctica
Sunken cruise ships
Cruise ships of Norway
Expedition cruising
Maritime incidents in 1972
Maritime incidents in 1979
Maritime incidents in 2007
November 2007 events
Ships built in Finland
Ships sunk by icebergs
Ships sunk with no fatalities
Shipwrecks in the Southern Ocean
Tourism in Antarctica
Maritime incidents involving cruise ships
Ships of Swedish American Line